is a Japanese footballer currently playing as a midfielder for Kagoshima United.

Career statistics

Club
.

Notes

References

External links

1997 births
Living people
Japanese footballers
Meiji University alumni
Association football midfielders
J3 League players
Kagoshima United FC players
Suzuka Point Getters players